Ørsta is the administrative centre of the municipality of Ørsta, Møre og Romsdal, Norway. The village is located at the innermost part of the Ørstafjorden, surrounded by the Sunnmørsalpene mountains.

This makes it the fourth largest urban area in all of Møre og Romsdal county.

Ørsta is the seat of the municipal government and it is also the commercial centre of the municipality.  There is a shopping center, industry, and Ørsta–Volda Airport, Hovden (on the southwest side of the village area).  Ørsta Church is also located in central part of Ørsta.  A regional high school and the Møre Folkehøgskule are both located in Ørsta.

References

Villages in Møre og Romsdal
Ørsta